Pusillina ehrenbergii is a species of minute sea snail, a marine gastropod mollusk or micromollusk in the family Rissoidae.

Description

Distribution

References

External links
 Philippi, R. A. (1844). Enumeratio molluscorum Siciliae cum viventium tum in tellure tertiaria fossilium, quae in itinere suo observavit. Vol. 2.. Halle (Halis Saxorum) Eduard Anton. iv + 303 pp., pls 13-28
 Brusina, S. (1866). Contribuzione pella fauna dei molluschi dalmati. Verhandlungen der Kaiserlich-königlichen Zoologisch-botanischen Gesellschaft in Wien. 16 (Beilage): 1-134, 1 pl

External links

Rissoidae
Gastropods described in 1844